Dendrocnide photinophylla, the shining-leaved stinging tree, is a rainforest tree of eastern Australia. It occurs from near the Colo River northwest of Sydney to Cooktown in tropical Queensland. A versatile species, it occurs in many different rainforest types. The specific epithet photinophylla translates to shining leaf. The generic name translates to stinging tree.

Common names
This species is known by many common names, including fibrewood, small-leaved nettle, mulberry-leaved stinging tree, and gympie.

Sting 

Stinging trees are often disliked by bush walkers and nature lovers because of the reaction of human skin to their stinging hairs. However, they are an important member of the ecosystems of Australian rainforests. The sting of this plant is not considered as severe as the related Dendrocnide excelsa or Dendrocnide moroides. However, avoiding the leaves and twigs is strongly recommended.

Description 

A medium to large-sized tree up to 30 metres tall, its stem diameter is up to 75 cm. The trunk is flanged or buttressed. The grey bark is fairly smooth, but with some bumps, lines and ridges. Its small branches are smooth and grey, with green at the ends.

The leaves are glossy with erect stinging hairs, particularly on the leaf veins, and are elliptic in shape, 6 to 13 cm long, and 3 to 8 cm wide.

Male and female flowers sometimes on separate trees, appearing yellowish green from November to June on small panicles from the leaf axils. The fruit are unevenly shaped nuts or achenes, resembling a mass of white grubs; they mature from January to March. The fruit would be edible for humans if not for the stinging hairs; they are eaten by many rainforest birds, including the regent bowerbird and the Torresian crow.

Uses 
Indigenous Australians used the fibres to make nets and bags.

References

photinophylla
Flora of New South Wales
Flora of Queensland
Rosales of Australia
Trees of Australia
Bushfood